Amsel may refer to:

Amsel (surname)
Amsel, Algeria, a village in Tamanrasset Province, Algeria

See also 

Amschel